Elizabeth Catherine Thomas Carne (1817–1873) was a British author, natural philosopher, geologist, conchologist, mineral collector, and philanthropist. In later years, following her father's death, she also became a banker. Today we would probably place her contributions to science in the realm of human ecology.

Personal life 
Carne was the fifth of six children born to Joseph Carne, FRS, and his wife Mary Thomas of Glamorgan. Elizabeth was born at Rivière House, in the parish of Phillack, near Hayle, Cornwall, and baptised in Phillack church on 15 May 1820. At Rivière House, owned by the Cornish Copper Company of which her father was the Company Director, the cellars were fitted out as laboratories where smelting processes of copper and tin were tested, and minerals and rocks studied for their constituents. To that laboratory had come, before she was born, Davies Gilbert, PFRS, bringing with him the young Humphry Davy to view the workings of a scientific environment. Born into an influential and wealthy Methodist family of mining agents and merchants, Elizabeth was acutely aware throughout her life of poverty and deprivation in surrounding mining areas, and the dire need for education and social support for those less fortunate. She read widely, studied mathematics, the classics, and learned several languages. Both her grandfather, often styled 'the Father of Cornish Methodism', and her father had been staunch and active Wesleyan Methodist class leaders within the Church of England, and the local Methodist book room was lodged in their home. Educated at home in Chapel Street, Penzance, with her sisters, she assisted her father with his extensive mineral collections and shared his keen interest in geological formations, age and density. A close and devoted friend, with whom she regularly corresponded, was the notable Quaker diarist, Caroline Fox of Falmouth's distinguished shipping and mining family.

Charitable works
On her father's death in 1858, she came into a large fortune, and used this legacy, following the charitable habits of her parents and family, to share considerable sums for educational and other philanthropic purposes. She gave the site for St Paul's school which opened, after her death, at Penzance on 2 February 1876, and founded schools at Wesley Rock (Heamoor), Carfury, and Bosullow, three thinly populated districts in the neighbourhood of Penzance.  She made possible by donating the purchase price for the land upon which St John's Hall (the town hall) was constructed and separately built a museum on Lower Queen's Street near her home, in which to exhibit the fine collection of minerals which she had assisted her father in amassing.

Geologist and author
She took up her father's partnership from 1858 until her death, as head of the Penzance Bank founded by her grandfather, William Carne, in 1795 (Batten, Carne and Oxnam). She also inherited her father's love of geology, and wrote four papers in the ‘Transactions of the Royal Geological Society of Cornwall:’ ‘Cliff Boulders and the Former Condition of the Land and Sea in the Land's End district,’ ‘The Age of the Maritime Alps surrounding Mentone,’ ‘On the Transition and Metamorphosis of Rocks,’ and ‘On the Nature of the Forces that have acted on the Formation of the Land's End Granite.’ She was the first woman to be elected a member of the Royal Geological Society of Cornwall. She was also an early member, with her friends Caroline Fox and Anna Maria Fox of the Royal Cornwall Polytechnic Society at Falmouth, Cornwall.

Many articles were contributed by her to the ‘London Quarterly Review,’ and she was the author of several books.

Notable Ideas 
Carne contradicted the idea that elevated sections of granite throughout England were caused by the erosion of the surrounding rock, instead suggesting that they were caused by what would later be knows as seismic waves. Two years after her death, one of Carne's papers on the subject was published in 'Transactions of the Royal Geological Society of Cornwall, Volume 9, Part 1'. Her writing suggested that previous connections drawn between granite fault-lines and magnetic fields were not based in fact. Her alternative explanation was that as certain locations within the granite were subject to greater pressure as they were forming, those areas developed smaller crystals, and were, therefore, stronger. Following this logic, she explained that the abrupt angles noticed in the valleys were caused by faults that formed along the boundaries of stronger and weaker rocks, not erosion. She considered these forces have a "nature of a law", drawing on the ideas of geologic uniformitarianism. Carne came to the conclusion that these natural phenomenon could have only been caused by a "great undulatory movement", like those caused by Earthquakes. She explained that "unsettled", soft granite would be bent into swelling hills and valleys (Folds), where as hardened granite would snap (Fault).

Also published in 'Transactions of the Royal Geological Society of Cornwall, Volume 9, Part 1', was Carnes account of metamorphosis, where she suggested that, as evident in the multitude of structures that could be taken on by a single substance, rocks must undergo some type of change over time. Carnes listed tremendous heat and pressure as the primary cause of these changes. Carne recognized that if some internal heat and pressure acted on one type of rock, she could assume that it also acted on the surrounding rock, further connecting her ideas to the theory of uniformitarianism. Later in her paper, Carne  disputes the idea that her local granite was formed by only by "igneous eruption", because of the precise arrangement of the surrounding rocks. Instead, she suggests that if its formation occurred when magma solidified, there would not be distinct layers of greenstone and purple rock surrounding the deposit. From this, she concluded that some other, more precise force, like pressure, must have influenced these formations.

Bias in Science 
According to UNESCO, "gender bias is also found in peer-review processes". An article published in the 117th volume of the 'Proceedings of the Geologists' Association' went on to describe Carne as "inclined to rambling speculation", despite her knowledge about her native regions geological makeup.

Death
Carne died at Penzance on 7 September 1873, and was buried at Phillack, five days later, on 12 September. Her funeral sermon was preached in St Mary's Church, Penzance, by the Reverend Prebendary Hedgeland on 14 September.

Works
She was the author of:
 ‘Three months' rest at Pau in the winter and spring of 1859’ — brought out with the pseudonym of John Altrayd Wittitterly in 1860.
 ‘Country Towns and the place they fill in Modern Civilization,’ 1868.
 ‘England's Three Wants’ — an anonymous spiritual pamphlet, 1871.
 ‘The Realm of Truth,’ 1873.

See also
Timeline of women in science

References

Attribution
 

1817 births
1873 deaths
19th-century British geologists
19th-century British women scientists
British women geologists
Geologists from Cornwall
Writers from Cornwall
English philanthropists
People from Penzance
19th-century British philanthropists